The 2006-07 Hungarian Cup (Hungarian: Magyar Kupa) had involved professional teams at all levels throughout the country. The winner of the Hungarian Cup is guaranteed no worse than one of Hungary's two spots in the UEFA Cup. 
In 2007, Honvéd Budapest won the competition by beating NB I champions VSC Debrecen in the final on May 9, 2007.

Third round
Teams participating in the third round came from the NB I., NB II., NB III., and county (megye) levels.

 Felcsút (II.), Pécsi MFC 0-2
 Létavértes (III.), Vác 0-1
 Törökszentmiklós (III.), MTK Budapest 0-8
 Budakalászi MSE (II.), Paks 0-1
 Monor (III.), Budapest Honvéd 2-6
 Koroncó SE (megye I.), Győr 2-7
 Sárszentmiklósi SE (megye I.), FC Sopron 0-1
 Elmax-Vasas SE (III.), FC Tatabánya 1-2
 Csurgói TK (III.), Kaposvári Rákóczi 0-3
 Andráshida (III.), Zalaegerszegi TE 2-4
 Tuzsér (II.), Rákospalotai EAC 0-3
 Kóka SE (megye I.), Vasas 0-8
 Kaposvölgye (II.), Ferencváros (II.) 1-2
 Berkenye SE (megye I.), Kazincbarcikai SC (II.) 1-1
 Eger (megye I.), Nyíregyháza (II.) 0-4
 Putnok (III.), Bőcs (II.) 6-2
 Kiskőrösi LC (megye I.), Orosháza (II.) 1-4
 Jászapáti VSE (II.), Soroksár (II.) 1-3 (h.u.)
 Karcag (II.), Vecsés FC (II.) 2-1
 Makó (II.), Kecskeméti TE (II.) 2-2 (T.: 5-3)
 Alba Régia FC (megye I.), Dunaújváros (II.) 1-5
 Márkó SE (megye I.), Budafoki LC (II.) 0-4
 Pannonhalma SE (megye I.), Gyirmót SE (II.) 0-6
 FC Ajka (III.), Lombard Pápa Termál (II.) 2-4
 Csesztreg SE (III.), Siófok (II.) 1-1
 Hévíz (II.), Barcs (II.) 2-1
 Tata (III.), Integrál-DAC (II.) 0-5
 Bonyhád-Völgység (III.), Szombathelyi Haladás (II.) 	1-0 (1.)
 Baktalórántháza (II.), Diósgyőri VTK 1-3 (2.)

Fourth round
The winners continued on to the fifth round. Of note was second division team Gyirmót SE defeating reigning Hungarian Cup champion Fehérvár.

 Gyirmót SE (II. division), Fehérvár 5-4 (2-1, 3-3, 4-3) - h.u.
 Csesztreg (III. division), Kaposvár 0-3 (0-1)
 Bonyhád (III. division), Sopron 1-6 (0-3)
 Makó (II. division), MTK Budapest 0-6 (0-3)

Fifth round
The first legs were played on November 8, 2006, with the second legs on
November 22.

|}

Quarter-finals
The first legs were played on March 21, 2007, while the second legs were played on April 4. Of note is Újpest FC vs. Debrecen, a rematch from the 2005–06 Hungarian Cup Quarter Finals, where Debrecen beat Újpest 3-0, agg.

|}

Semi-finals

|}

Final

References

External links
 Official site 
 soccerway.com

2006-07
2006–07 domestic association football cups
Magyar